Dragon tongue bean, or dragon tongue shelling bean, is young green bean (snap bean) of cranberry bean, pinto bean in the species Phaseolus vulgaris (shell bean). 

Other names for this Heirloom Bush yellow wax dwarf bean include:  'Dragon Langerie', 'Merveille de Piemonte' and 'Meraviglia del Piemonte'.

Characteristics
Dragon tongue bean is a flavorful, juicy bean whose seeds are encased in a buffed colorful pod with mottled burgundy patterns throughout the shell's surface. The shelled beans are pale pistachio green in color, their size, petite, and their shape, ovate and slightly curved.

Days to maturation is approximately 55-60 days. 

Fully grown plant height is approximately 2-3 feet tall. 

Time from flower to bean is approximately 12 to 15 days.

Growing requirements

Soil Temperature required for Germination: 	60–85°F 

Seed Depth: 	1"

Seed Spacing: 	4"

Row Spacing: 	18–36"

Fertilizer Needs: 	Low

Uses
Dragon tongue bean can be harvested, picked and used for their pods as well as for their seeds like a green bean (snap bean) or allowed to mature into a shell bean for using their seeds only.

References

Further reading
 

Phaseolus
Edible legumes